The Frunthorn is a mountain of the Swiss Lepontine Alps, overlooking the Zervreilasee in the canton of Graubünden. It is located west of Vals, on the ridge between the Val Lumnezia and the Valsertal.

References

External links

 Frunthorn on Hikr

Mountains of the Alps
Mountains of Switzerland
Alpine three-thousanders
Mountains of Graubünden
Lepontine Alps